Årsjön is a lake in Stockholm County, Södermanland, Sweden. It is located in Tyresta National Park.

Lakes of Stockholm County